South Florida Aquatic Club is a swim club based in Pembroke Pines, Florida, United States. Founded in 2010, it offers training for beginner and elite swimmers. The aquatics club is best known for developing a number of Olympic swimmers.

Notable swimmers
 Alia Atkinson
 Claire Donahue
 Marc Rojas
Natasha Moodie

References

Swimming clubs
Sports clubs established in 2010
2010 establishments in Florida
Pembroke Pines, Florida
Sports teams in Florida